Leutnant (later Major) Alfred Lindenberger was a World War I flying ace credited with twelve aerial victories. He also scored four victories during World War II while serving as commander of a fighter group.

World War I military service

While Lindenberger was a gunner  in FA 234, he shot down a Spad with pilot Vizfeldwebel Breitenstein on 29 May 1917. Then he was teamed with ace pilot Vizfeldwebel Karl Jentsch, and they scored two more SPADs in October. After pilot training, in May 1918 Lindenberger was posted to Jagdstaffel 2. Between 30 May and 1 November 1918, he downed nine more enemy planes, seven flying the Fokker D.VII. He also flew Fokker D.VI serial number 4453/18 upon occasion. It was marked with black and yellow stripes around the fuselage.

Aerial victories

Between the Wars

Alfred Lindenberger joined the Luftwaffe and rose to the rank of major.

World War II military service

In June 1944, Major Lindenberger served with JG 3 and then flew air defense sorties with JG 300 over Germany until February 1945. He was made II./ JG 300 Gruppenkommandeur in October 1944. Owing to his age and inexperience with modern fighters he flew most sorties as a wingman. On 28 September 1944 he claimed a B-17 over Hildesheim and a P-51 Mustang near Quedlinburg before he was shot down by P-51s and wounded, bailing out over Halberstadt. Lindenberger then claimed two US B-24 four-engined bombers on 17 December 1944 during a 15th Air Force raid over Poland, (JG 300 claimed 22 B-24s downed).

He thus scored four World War II victories in total, making his lifetime tally sixteen aerial victories.

Sources of information

References

 479th Fighter Group: ‘Riddle’s Raiders’ (Aviation Elite Units). John Stanaway. Osprey Publishing, 2009. , 
Above the Lines: The Aces and Fighter Units of the German Air Service, Naval Air Service and Flanders Marine Corps 1914 - 1918. Norman L. R. Franks, et al. Grub Street, 1993. , .
 Aces of Jagdgeschwader Nr. III. Greg vanWyngarden. Bloomsbury Publishing, 2016. , 
 Luftwaffe Sturmgruppen (Aviation Elite Units). John Weal. Osprey Publishing, 2005. , 
 Oswald Boelcke: Germany's First Fighter Ace and Father of Air Combat. R. G. Head. Grub Street, 2016. , .

German World War I flying aces
1897 births
1973 deaths
Military personnel from Stuttgart
German World War II fighter pilots